La Musica is a 1967 French drama film directed by Marguerite Duras and Paul Séban after Duras' play of the same name (fr) first performed 8 October 1965 at the Studio des Champs-Elysées.

Cast
 Delphine Seyrig : Elle
 Robert Hossein : Lui
 Julie Dassin : La jeune fille
 Gérard Blain

References

1967 films
Films based on works by Marguerite Duras
Films directed by Marguerite Duras
French drama films
1960s French-language films
1960s French films